Delias periboea is a butterfly in the family Pieridae. It was described by Jean-Baptiste Godart in 1819. It is found in both the Indomalayan realm and the Australasian realm; East and West of the Wallace line.

Subspecies
D. p. periboea (Java, Kangean Islands)
D. p. alorensis Fruhstorfer, 1899 (Alor)
D. p. floresiana Roepke, 1954 (Flores)
D. p. livia  Fruhstorfer, 1896 (Lombok)
D. p. atakei Nakano, 1993 (Kangean)
D. p. pagenstecheri Fruhstorfer, 1896 (Sumba)
D. p. wallacei Rothschild, 1892 (Bali)

References

External links
Delias at Markku Savela's Lepidoptera and Some Other Life Forms

periboea
Butterflies described in 1819
Butterflies of Asia
Butterflies of Australia
Taxa named by Jean-Baptiste Godart